James F. Woodward (born 1941) is a professor emeritus of history and an adjunct professor of physics at California State University, Fullerton. He is best known for a physics hypothesis that he proposed in 1990, later expanded, that predicts several physical effects that he refers to as 'Mach effects'. Woodward claims the effect could be used as a reactionless drive for space travel.

Education and professorships
 A.B., Middlebury College, 1964, Physics
 M.S., New York University, 1969, Physics
 Ph.D., University of Denver, 1972, History of science

Woodward is a professor emeritus of history and an adjunct professor of physics at California State University, Fullerton.

Mach effects
Woodward claims that his hypothesis predicts physical forces that he calls Mach effects but are also referred to as the Woodward effect. He says that his hypothesis is based on Mach's principle that posits inertia, the resistance of mass to acceleration, is a result of the mutual gravitational attraction of all matter in the universe. Thus, if the mass of a given object can be varied while being oscillated in a linear or orbital path, such that the mass is high while the mass is moving in one direction and low while moving back, then the net effect should be acceleration in one direction as the inertial drag of the universe upon the object varies as its mass varies. If a spacecraft engine could be designed to exploit it then acceleration could be produced without using rocket propellants. The effect is controversial because within mainstream physics the underlying model proposed for it appears to be faulty, resulting in violations of energy conservation as well as momentum conservation. Woodward and his associates have claimed since the 1990s to have successfully measured forces at levels great enough for practical use and also claim to be working on the development of a practical prototype thruster. No practical working devices have been publicly demonstrated, and other experiments have failed to corroborate these claims.

Speculation on space travel
He frequently contributes to articles on speculative space travel subjects, especially wormholes. In 2012 he published a book on the application of the physical effects predicted by his hypothesis to space travel.

References

External links
 James Woodward page at Cal State Fullerton
 

Living people
California State University, Fullerton faculty
Middlebury College alumni
New York University alumni
University of Denver alumni
1941 births